Hareidlandet is an island in Møre og Romsdal county, Norway. The island is divided between Hareid Municipality and Ulstein Municipality. The  island has a population of 13,030 (as of 2015). The island is mentioned by Snorri in his reports about the Battle of Hjörungavágr (now Hjørungavåg) in 986, where Haakon Jarl defeated Bue Digre and the Jomsvikings.

The island is home to one town, Ulsteinvik, and several larger villages: Eiksund, Haddal, Hasund, Brandal, Hareid, and Hjørungavåg.  The island is connected to the mainland to the south via the Eiksund Bridge to the island of Eika which in turn is connected to the mainland through the Eiksund Tunnel.  On the west side, the island has bridge connections to the islands of Dimnøya and Gurskøya.  On the east side, there is a ferry connection to the island of Sula.

The Old Norse name of the island was feminine Höð (modern har- from the Old Norse genitive haðar). The etymology of the name is unknown; a suggested meaning of "lake" is speculative, the connection with höð, "battle", is spurious. The Old Norse name of the island was adopted by the local  association football team of the municipality of Ulstein, IL Hødd, when the team was established in 1919.

See also
List of islands of Norway

References

Islands of Møre og Romsdal
Ulstein
Hareid